Charles Vedder Sitton (September 22, 1881 – September 11, 1931), also known as Carl, C. V. and Vet Sitton, was a baseball player and coach. He attended Clemson College, where he also played football, and later coached baseball for the Tigers.

In  his first two years as a pitcher  in the minor leagues, he led his teams to a regional pennant.

Early years
Sitton was born to Henry Philip and Amy Wilkinson Sitton in Pendleton, South Carolina on September 22, 1881, the second of five children. He was named after a renowned Charleston Presbyterian minister. Known on the sports pages as Carl or C. V., his family called him Vedder. Sitton's grandfather, John B. Sitton, built the first brick building in the town square of the Old Pendleton district; his father and an uncle, Augustus, fought for the Confederacy in the American Civil War. Augustus was later prominent in the Red Shirt movement.

Clemson College
Sitton enrolled Clemson College in 1901, attending through 1903 but never graduating. He played football and baseball for coach John Heisman's Clemson Tigers.

Football
According to one source,  "Vetter Sitton and Hope Sadler were the finest ends that Clemson ever had perhaps". Sitton played on the left and Sadler on the right on Clemson's football teams. Both were All-Southern football players in 1902 and 1903. 1902 saw a 44–5 beatdown of Georgia Tech in which Sitton scored first on an 80-yard end run. The day before the game, Clemson sent in scrubs to Atlanta, checked into a hotel, and partied until dawn. The varsity sat well rested in Lula, Georgia as those who bet on Tech were fooled.

In 1903, Sitton was reportedly injured before the Georgia Tech contest.  Tech rooters thought perhaps it was another ruse from Heisman.  It was no ruse, but Sitton's substitute Gil Ellison played well enough for a 73–0 rout. The 24–0 win over Davidson saw one writer note "Clemson playing against eleven wooden men, would attract attention;" and Sitton had a 60-yard touchdown run.

The 1903 Tigers went on to play in the South's first conference championship game, tying Cumberland 11–11. The tying score came after Cumberland muffed a punt. Cumberland expected a trick play when Fritz Furtick simply ran up the middle for a touchdown. One account of the play reads "Heisman saw his chance to exploit a weakness in the Cumberland defense: run the ball where the ubiquitous Red Smith wasn't. So the next time Sitton started out on one of his slashing end runs, at the last second he tossed the ball back to the fullback who charges straight over center (where Smith would have been except that he was zeroing in on the elusive Sitton) and went all the way for the tying touchdown."

Baseball
He was also a starting pitcher for the baseball team, "one of the best pitchers Clemson ever had". and "one of the best twirlers in the country." According to one account, "Sitton is considered one of the best college twirlers in the south ... He is a heady pitcher, and knows just what to do in every emergency." He posted an 18–4 career record, including records of 5-2, 7-2, and 6-0 in his three years on the varsity.

Pro baseball

After college Sitton played baseball in a number of cities, batting and throwing right-handed. He had his pitching debut with the Jacksonville Jays, leading the team to the South Atlantic League (SALLY) championship.

Nashville Vols
Sitton was then a starting pitcher for the Southern Association champion 1908 Nashville Vols. The club, under manager Bill Bernhard, entered the final day of that season with an opportunity to win the league pennant. The championship would be decided by the last game of the season, between the Vols and the New Orleans Pelicans at Sulphur Dell. Both teams had the same number of losses (56), but the Pelicans were in first place with 76 wins to the Vols' second-place 74.

A crowd of 11,000 saw Sitton use his spitball to outpitch Ted Breitenstein for a complete-game, nine-strikeout, three-hit, 1–0 shutout, giving Nashville its third Southern Association pennant by .002 percentage points. The Nashville team and the fans mobbed the pitcher on the mound.

Grantland Rice called it "the greatest game ever played in Dixie". According to one account, "By one run, by one point, Nashville has won the Southern League pennant, nosing New Orleans out literally by an eyelash. Saturday's game, which was the deciding one, between Nashville and New Orleans was the greatest exhibition of the national game ever seen in the south and the finish in the league race probably sets a record in baseball history".

Nashville Banner sportswriters Fred Russell and George Leonard created all-time team lists of the top Nashville players from 1901 to 1919 and from 1920 to 1963. Sitton was named a pitcher on the former team.

Cleveland Naps
Nap Lajoie's Cleveland Naps soon lured Sitton from the Nashville club, making him the first Clemson player to play in the major leagues. Sitton was optimistic when he arrived at spring training to replace the ailing Glenn Liebhardt. He pitched well in the preseason, including a shutout against Mobile. Sitton made his major-league debut on April 24, 1909 against Rube Waddell and the St. Louis Browns, winning the game. He also won his second game, against Walter Johnson and the Washington Senators.

Although Sitton had an early 3–0 record, he was overshadowed by other pitchers on the club such as  Cy Young and Addie Joss. With his high hits–to–innings ratio, he was relegated to the bullpen. Sitton played his last game in the majors on September 2, 1909, against the New York Yankees; he did not finish the game, losing 6–1.

He appeared in a total of 14 games (five as a starter), posting a 3–2 record and a 2.88 ERA. Sitton had as many hits as innings pitched and a 1:1 strikeout-to-walk ratio.

Return to minors
Sitton then returned to the minors, playing with the Montreal Royals, Atlanta Crackers, Troy Trojans, and Binghamton Bingoes.

Clemson as coach
He was head baseball coach of the Clemson Tigers in 1915 and 1916. Before his hiring, Sitton was known as a frequenter of Clemson games. Sitton posted a 26–18–1 career coaching record.

Traveling salesman
After 1916, Sitton's career as baseball player and coach apparently ended. He surfaced again in the 1920s as an employee of the California-based Hercules Powder Company, a former munitions firm which manufactured fertilizer. Sitton lived in the Daniel Ashley Hotel in Valdosta, Georgia at the beginning of the Great Depression, and lost his job around 1931.

Death
On the morning of September 11, 1931, two weeks before his 50th birthday, Sitton borrowed a car from a Valdosta native and drove to the Lowndes County Fairgrounds. There, parked near the baseball diamond, he shot himself in the head.<ref> Although no motive was directly stated, his suicide was most likely because he lost his job.

Notes

References

Bibliography

External links

 

1881 births
1931 suicides
American football ends
Major League Baseball pitchers
Atlanta Crackers players
Binghamton Bingoes players
Clemson Tigers baseball coaches
Clemson Tigers baseball players
Clemson Tigers football players
Cleveland Naps players
Columbus Senators players
Jacksonville Jays players
Montreal Royals players
Nashville Vols players
Troy Trojans (minor league) players
All-Southern college football players
People from Pendleton, South Carolina
Players of American football from South Carolina
Baseball players from South Carolina
Suicides by firearm in Georgia (U.S. state)
Baseball coaches from South Carolina